Lodewijk is the Dutch name for Louis. In specific it may refer to:

Given name

Literature 
 Lodewijk Hartog van Banda (1916–2006), Dutch comic strip writer
 Lodewijk Paul Aalbrecht Boon, (1912-1979)  Flemish writer
 Lodewijk van Deyssel, (1864-1952) late 19th century Dutch literary critic and a leading member of the Tachtigers
 Lodewijk Elzevir (1540s–1617), 16th century printer and publisher of books and bibles
 Lodewijk de Koninck (1838–1924), Flemish writer

Music
 Edward Lodewijk Van Halen, (1955-2020)  American guitarist
 Lodewijk Ferdinand Dieben (better known as Lou Bandy), Dutch singer and cabaret conferencier
 Lodewijk Fluttert (born 1991) Dutch DJ and producer
 Lodewijk Mortelmans (1868–1952), Belgian classical composer
 Lodewijk Parisius (1911–1963), Dutch/Surinamese tenor saxophonist

Sports
 Jan-Lodewijk de Vries, (born 1972) Dutch water polo player
 Lodewijk De Clerck (1936–2018), Belgian sprinter
 Lodewijk de Kruif (born 1969), Dutch football coach and former professional player
 Lodewijk Jacobs (born 1951), Dutch sprint canoer
 Lodewijk Prins, (1913-1959) Dutch chess grandmaster
 Lodewijk Roembiak (born 1969), retired Dutch footballer

Other fields 
 Lodewijk Asscher (born 1974), Dutch politician
 Lodewijk Bruckman (1903–1995), Dutch magic realist painter
 Lodewijk Caspar Valckenaer (1715–1785), 16th century Dutch classical scholar
 Lodewijk De Raet (1870–1914), Flemish politician
 Lodewijk de Vadder (1605–1655), Flemish Baroque landscape painter, draughtsman, engraver, and tapestry designer
 Lodewijk De Witte (born 1954), governor of the Belgian province of Flemish Brabant
 Lodewijk Freidrich Paulus (born 1957), Indonesian politician 
 Lodewijk Gerard Brocx (1819–1880), Dutch politician
 Lodewijk Heyligen (1304–1361), Flemish Benedictine monk and music theorist
 Lodewijk Makeblijde (1565–1630), Flemish Jesuit and a Renaissance poet and hymn writer
 Lodewijk Meyer (1629–1681), Dutch physician, classical scholar, translator, lexicographer, and playwright
 Lodewijk Napoleon, Dutch form of Louis I Napoleon Bonaparte, King of Holland
 Lodewijk Sigismund Vincent Gustaaf van Heyden (in Russian known as Login Geiden), Dutch admiral
 Lodewijk Thomson (1869–1914), Dutch military commander and politician
 Lodewijk Toeput (1550–1605), Flemish landscape painter and draftsman active in Italy
 Lodewijk van Bylandt (1718–1793), Dutch lieutenant-admiral
 Lodewijk van den Berg (1932-2022), Dutch-American chemical engineer
 Lodewijk van Gruuthuse (1427-1492), Flemish knight and nobleman
 Lodewijk van Schoor (1645-1702), Flemish painter, draughtsman and designer of tapestries
 Lodewijk van Velthem, a Flemish poet and priest
 Lodewijk Woltjer (1930-2019), astronomer, and the son of the astronomer Jan Woltjer

Surname
 Martin Lodewijk (born 1939), Dutch comics writer and cartoonist

See also
 Lodewyk
 Lode (name)
 Ludwig (given name)
 Ludvik

Surnames
Dutch masculine given names
Dutch-language surnames  

de:Lodewijk